Appapara or Appappara is a small village in Wayanad district of Kerala state, India.

Location
Appappara is located on the border between Kerala and Karnataka near to near Thirunelli Temple .

Education
The nearest schools are Government Highschool Kattikkulam and Ashram school, Thirunelli.

Administration
Appapara is part of Thirunelli panchayath. The pin code for Appapara village is 670646 .

Churches
There is one St. George Church in Appappara. It comes under the Syro Malabar church of Mananthavady.

See also
 Papanasini River
 Iruppu Falls
 Brahmagiri Hills
 Thirunelli temple
 Kattikkulam

References

Mananthavady Area